Milan Matulović (10 June 1935 – 9 October 2013) was a chess grandmaster who was the second or third strongest Yugoslav player for much of the 1960s and 1970s behind Svetozar Gligorić and possibly Borislav Ivkov. He was primarily active before 1977, but remained an occasional tournament competitor until 2006.

Career

Matulović was born in Belgrade. In 1958 he played a four-game training match with Bobby Fischer, of which he won one, drew one and lost two. He achieved the International Master title in 1961 and became a Grandmaster in 1965.

He won the Yugoslav Chess Championships of 1965 and 1967 and was a prolific competitor on the international tournament scene during the 1960s and 1970s. Probably his best result was equal first with Gligorić, Ivkov and Lev Polugaevsky at Skopje 1969 ahead of former World Chess Champion Mikhail Botvinnik and multiple candidate Efim Geller. Other first-place finishes during this period, either shared or outright, included Netanya 1961, Vršac 1964, Novi Sad 1965, Belgrade 1965, Reggio Emilia 1967/68, Athens Zonal 1969, Belgrade 1969, Sarajevo 1971, Birmingham 1975, Bajmok 1975 (and in 1978), Majdanpek 1976, Vrbas 1976, Belgrade 1977 and Odzaci 1978. From the 1980s his tournament victories became less frequent, but included Osijek 1980, Borovo 1980, Helsinki 1981 and Vrnjacka Banja 1985. He repeated his Vrnjacka Banja success in 1990.

He had excellent results in the Chess Olympiads. He played 78 games in six events for Yugoslavia, with the overall result of 46 wins, 28 draws and four losses, for a 76.9 percent score, the 10th all-time best olympic performance.

His pursuit of the world championship was less successful, as he never advanced to the Candidates stage of the process for selecting a challenger for the title. He played in the 1970 "USSR versus Rest of the World" match on eighth board against Botvinnik, losing one game and drawing the other three. A controversy attended this pairing, as Matulović had a history of poor results against the Soviet player; there were accusations that the Soviet team captain had placed Botvinnik on a lower board than his stature would warrant in order to take advantage of this.

Controversies

Matulović was involved with controversial incidents.  he played on in hopeless positions when grandmaster etiquette called for a resignation, allegedly in the hopes of reaching adjournment (suspension of a game for resumption on a later day, common in tournament play at the time) so that the news reports would read "Matulović's game is adjourned" rather than "Matulović lost."

More seriously, after the 1970 Interzonal tournament at Palma de Mallorca, he was accused of "throwing" his game against Mark Taimanov in return for a $400 bribe, thus allowing Taimanov to advance to the Candidates matches, where Taimanov was defeated by Bobby Fischer 6–0. The accusations centered on Matulović's conduct during the game and the alleged feebleness of his resistance. It has also been suggested that he was simply uninterested in the game, however, having been eliminated from contention for the Candidates matches. The score of this game follows:

Perhaps Matulović's most notorious transgression was against István Bilek at the Sousse Interzonal in 1967. He played a losing move but then took it back after saying "j'adoube" ("I adjust" – spoken before adjusting pieces on their square, see touch-move rule). His opponent complained to the arbiter but the move was allowed to stand. This incident earned Matulović the nickname "J'adoubovic". This reportedly happened several times, including in a game against Bobby Fischer.

Matulović was convicted of vehicular manslaughter and served nine months in prison for a car accident in which a woman was killed.

Playing style

Matulović's sharp attacking play was demonstrated in this game against the Bulgarian grandmaster Georgi Tringov from the 1970 Chess Olympiad at Siegen.

See also
 Cheating in chess

References and notes

Bibliography

External links 
 
 
 

1935 births
2013 deaths
Chess grandmasters
Chess Olympiad competitors
Serbian chess players
Yugoslav chess players
Sportspeople from Belgrade